Akimerus is a genus of long-horned beetles in the family Cerambycidae.

References

Lepturinae
Beetles described in 1835
Cerambycidae genera